Justin Kan (born July 16, 1983) is an American internet entrepreneur and investor. He is the co-founder of live video platforms Justin.tv and Twitch, as well as the mobile social video application Socialcam. He is also the cofounder and former CEO of law-tech company Atrium.

He was formerly a partner at Silicon Valley incubator Y Combinator. His attempt to broadcast his entire life at Justin.tv, which he named after himself, popularized the term "lifecasting". Kan also started a Reddit-style electronic music discovery platform, The Drop.

In March 2019, along with YouTube co-founder Steve Chen he became advisor to Theta, a peer-to-peer video streaming platform that uses blockchain technology.

Career

Justin.tv 

In 2007, Justin Kan and partners Emmett Shear, Michael Seibel and Kyle Vogt started Justin.tv, a 24–7 live video feed of Kan's life, broadcast via a webcam attached to his head. Kan was 23 years old at the time.

Kan's "lifecasting" lasted about eight months. Kan's concept attracted media attention, and resulting interviews with him included one by Ann Curry on the Today Show. Viewers accompanied Kan as he walked the streets of San Francisco, sometimes involved in both pre-planned events (trapeze lesson, dance lesson) and spontaneous situations (being invited into the local Scientology center by a sidewalk recruiter).

Afterward, the company transitioned to providing a live video platform so anyone could publish a live video stream. Justin.tv, the platform, launched in 2007 and was one of the largest live video platforms in the world with more than 30 million unique users every month.

Justin.tv was closed on August 5, 2014, in an effort to focus further on Justin.tv's parent company, Twitch.

Twitch 

After Justin.tv launched in 2007, the site quickly began building subject-specific content categories like Social, Tech, Sports, Entertainment, News & Events, Gaming and others. Gaming, in particular, grew very fast and became the most popular content on the site.

The company then decided to spin off the gaming content under a separate brand at a separate site. They named it TwitchTV, inspired by the term twitch gameplay. It launched officially in public beta on June 6, 2011.

Twitch was acquired by Amazon.com in August 2014 for $970 million.

Socialcam 
Socialcam launched March 7, 2011, was bought by Autodesk July 17, 2012 for $60 million and was ended by Autodesk October 28, 2015.  Socialcam was a mobile social video application for iPhone and Android that allowed users to capture and share video online and on mobile, as well as via Facebook, Twitter, and other social networks.

At one point, the application eclipsed 2 million downloads and continued to add to its features list, most notably with the addition of video filters.

Exec 
Justin Kan launched Exec on February 29, 2012, a new service to allow anyone to outsource anything you want for $25/hour. Exec was co-founded with his brother Daniel Kan, former head of UserVoice business development, and Stanford graduate Amir Ghazvinian.

Exec was purchased by Handybook, a company founded by Oisin Hanrahan, Umang Dua, Ignacio Leonhardt, and Weina Scott, in an all-stock transaction in January 2014.

Y Combinator 
Kan was a member of the first batch of YC-funded startups in 2005 for Kiko Calendar, and was funded by YC again for Justin.tv and Exec. Kan became a partner at Y Combinator in March 2014, where he offered advice to the new startups in each batch. In March 2017, Kan left Y Combinator to start his own incubator, Zero-F.

The Drop 

The Drop is a Reddit-style electronic music discovery platform that launched early 2015. Users can post and up-vote community curated and sourced tracks. It was founded by Kan and his college friend Ranidu Lankage.

Atrium 
Kan publicly launched Atrium in 2017. Kan raised $10.5 million in an initial "party" round of investment led by General Catalyst  In September 2018, Kan raised a $65 million funding round led by Andreessen Horowitz.  At that time, Andrew Chen, Marc Andreessen and Michael Seibel joined the Atrium board of directors. Atrium closed operations in March 2020.

YouTube 
Justin Kan started a YouTube channel in 2021. In February 2021 he announced that one can collect his YouTube videos as non-fungible tokens on OpenSea.

Fractal 
Justin Kan started Fractal.is in December 2021 as a marketplace for players to buy Solana-based NFTs directly from game companies as well as a secondary marketplace for peer-to-peer trading. In April 2022 Fractal has raised $35 million in a seed round led by Paradigm and Multicoin Capital. Other investors include Andreessen Horowitz (a16z), Solana Labs, Animoca Brands, Coinbase Ventures and Terraform Labs CEO Do Kwon, among others.

References

External links 

 
 Blog 'A really bad idea'
 Justin Kan: video interview for Princeton Startup TV

1983 births
Businesspeople in information technology
Living people
Place of birth missing (living people)
Yale University alumni
American venture capitalists
Y Combinator people
Twitch (service) people
American people of Chinese descent